William Burgess (second ¼ 1897 – death unknown) was an English professional rugby league footballer who played in the 1910s, 1920s and 1930s.

Background
Bill Burgess' birth was registered in Barrow-in-Furness district, Lancashire, England.

International honours
Bill Burgess won caps for England while at Barrow in 1923 against Wales, in 1924 against Other Nationalities, in 1925 against Wales (2 matches), in 1926 against Wales, and Other Nationalities, in 1928 against Wales, and in 1930 against Other Nationalities, and won caps for Great Britain while at Barrow in 1924 against Australia (3 matches), and New Zealand (3 matches), in 1926-27 against New Zealand (3 matches), in 1928 against Australia (3 matches), and New Zealand (2 matches), and in 1929-30 against Australia (2 matches).

Honoured at Barrow Raiders
Bill Burgess is a Barrow Raiders Hall of Fame inductee.

Genealogical Information
Bill Burgess was the father of the rugby league footballer; Bill Burgess.

Outside of rugby league
Following his retirement from playing rugby league, Bill Burgess was the Landlord of the Washington Hotel, Roose Road, Barrow-in-Furness

References

External links
Hall of Fame at barrowrlfc.com

1897 births
Barrow Raiders players
England national rugby league team players
English rugby league players
Great Britain national rugby league team players
Lancashire rugby league team players
Place of death missing
Rugby league players from Barrow-in-Furness
Rugby league props
Year of death missing